The West Street District is a historic district on West Street in Boston, Massachusetts, one of the city's "ladder districts" that runs between Tremont Street and Washington Street in the Downtown Crossing commercial/retail area.  The district includes four buildings located near the corner of Tremont and West Streets, all built in the early 20th century.  The two buildings at 148-150 Tremont Street were once occupied by Chandler and Company, an exclusive department store. Number 148 is a Renaissance Revival structure built as an office building in 1912, and number 150 was built in 1903 to house the Oliver Ditson Company, a music publisher.  The Fabyan building at 26-30 West Street was designed by Coolidge, Shepley, Bulfinch & Abbott, and built in 1926.  The Schraffts Building at 16-24 West Street was built in 1922, and housed a flagship candy store and restaurant for more than fifty years.

The West Street District was added to the National Register of Historic Places in 1980.

Gallery

See also 
 National Register of Historic Places listings in northern Boston, Massachusetts

References

Historic districts in Suffolk County, Massachusetts
National Register of Historic Places in Boston
Historic districts on the National Register of Historic Places in Massachusetts